Sir Robert Balfour, 1st Baronet (6 March 1844 – 4 November 1929) was a Scottish Liberal Party politician who sat in the House of Commons of the United Kingdom from 1906 to 1922. He was the member of parliament for Partick from 1906 to 1918, and for or Glasgow Partick from 1918 to 1922.

Background
He was born in Pilmuir, Largo, Fife in 1844, a son of James Balfour. He was educated at Madras College in St Andrews. He married Josephine Maria Beazley of Liverpool. They had two sons.

Business career
In 1863 he joined the merchant firm Balfour, Williamson & Co. From 1869 to 1893, he was stationed in San Francisco. From 1893 to 1899 he was based in Liverpool and then in London from 1899.

Political career
In 1906, Balfour was elected as a Member of Parliament in Glasgow. At the following General Election in 1918, he supported the Coalition government of Lloyd George, and was awarded the 'coupon';
He retired from Parliament just before the 1922 UK general election.

He was created a Baronet on 3 February 1911. The baronetcy became extinct upon his death in 1929.

Electoral history

Notes

References

Further reading

1844 births
1929 deaths
Baronets in the Baronetage of the United Kingdom
Members of the Parliament of the United Kingdom for Glasgow constituencies
Scottish Liberal Party MPs
UK MPs 1906–1910
UK MPs 1910
UK MPs 1910–1918
UK MPs 1918–1922
People educated at Madras College
People from Upper Largo